Revolution is not a dinner party, or making revolution is not inviting people over for dinner, is a phrase coined by Mao Zedong. It is taken from Mao's essay titled Report on an Investigation of the Peasant Movement in Hunan written in 1927 during the Land Revolution. It means that a revolution should not be gentle and soft, but determined and thorough, and it is a violent and bloody action of one class overthrowing another class.

In this report, Mao stated that "A revolution is not a dinner party, or writing an essay, or painting a picture, or doing embroidery; it cannot be so refined, so leisurely and gentle, so temperate, kind, courteous, restrained and magnanimous. A revolution is an insurrection, an act of violence by which one class overthrows another."

Based on this view, historian Zhang Ming further pointed out that "a revolution is not a dinner party, a revolution is a petition to eat". The saying is also the basis of a political joke: "for many cadres  Geming bushi qingke jiushi chifan 'Revolution is either entertaining guests, or eating dinner [at public expense or at the cost of the nouveaux riches]."

See also
Political power grows out of the barrel of a gun

References 

Maoism
Maoist terminology
Maoist China
Marxism–Leninism
Political catchphrases